Počúvadlo is a village and municipality in Banská Štiavnica District, in the Banská Bystrica Region of Slovakia.

Etymology
The name comes from Slovak počúvať - to listen (the modern meaning), but also to observe, to watch (historic). Počúvadlo - an observation point, a watchtower. Pocholla 1333, Pochyualla 1388, Pochowala 1511, Počuwadlo 1773, Počuwadlo 1808, Počúvadlo 1920.

References

Villages and municipalities in Banská Štiavnica District